Sun Chao may refer to:

Sun Chao (fencer) (born 1983), female Chinese foil fencer
Sun Chao (racewalker) (born 1987), Chinese racewalker